The La Masa class was a class of eight destroyers of the Italian Regia Marina (Royal Navy) constructed during the First World War. Like other obsolete Italian destroyers, they were reclassified as torpedo boats in 1929, and seven ships served throughout the Second World War. Two ships were sunk in air attacks while in Italian service during the Second World War, one was sunk by a mine, two more were scuttled. The remaining two ships survived the war and continued to serve in the post-war Marina Militare, being decommissioned in 1957–1958.

Design and description
The La Masa class was developed from the Sirtori class destroyers. Four ships were ordered in 1915, four more in 1916. All eight ships were built by the Odero shipyard in Sestri Ponente near Genoa. Their main armament was provided by four  Schneider-Armstrong 1917 L/45 guns, the two bow ones side by side, the two aft one behind the other on the centre line. These guns were Italian-made licensed copies of the British QF 4in Mk V gun. Additionally, the destroyers carried four  torpedo tubes in twin mounts. Also up to ten mines could be deployed. Because of these new and heavy armaments, the main armament was reduced compared to the Sirtori-class from six to four. Because two aft guns were positioned on the center line, the broadside was still made up of three guns.

Their displacement was  standard and  full load. The machinery consisted of four oil-fired Thornycroft boilers and two Tosi steam turbines that delivered . The ships had two shafts. The maximum speed when commissioned was  but it had dropped to just  at the beginning of World War II. The ship's complement was 4 officers and 74 ratings.

In 1929 the ships were reclassified as torpedo boats. Their armament was modified after Italy's entry into WW2, mainly in order to strengthen their anti-air capabilities. The modifications differed between ships. Six  Breda Model 35 L/65 anti-aircraft guns were installed in their place as well as two depth charge throwers. On  and  a  triple torpedo tube set was installed behind the third funnel, in addition to the 450 mm twin tube set on the aft deck. Moreover, these two ships had four 20 mm Breda Model 35 anti-aircraft guns installed in twin mounts. After the modifications, the displacement varied between  standard and  full load.

As minesweepers, they retained only one 102 mm gun and three 20 mm AA guns, but were now equipped with radar and mine clearing gear.

Service
The destroyers of the La Masa class, like their predecessors, were used in the Adriatic against the Austro-Hungarian k.u.k. Kriegsmarine. One ship was lost on 10 April 1918, when the Benedetto Cairoli which had only been in service for two months, sank  in the Ionian Sea after a collision with her sister ship Giacinto Carini.

On the night of 8 October 1919, Agostino Bertani, which was only completed in June 1919 as the penultimate ship of the class, was taken over by officers in Trieste, who wanted to join Gabriele D'Annunzio in Fiume. They sailed with the destroyer to Fiume. D'Annunzio declared Fiume independent against the wishes of the Italian government. Italy captured Fiume in December 1920 and the ships that defected to D'Annunzio's legionaries returned to the Regia Marina in January 1921, where they were decommissioned. Along with the other defected ships, Bertani was renamed: she was put back into service as Enrico Cosenz. The new namesake Enrico Cosenz (1820–1898) was the first chief of staff of the Italian army.

In 1923, several destroyers of the class were deployed in the Corfu incident with the squadrons off Corfu and in the Dodecanese, which were intended to exert pressure on Greece.

Ships

Notes

Sources

External links
 Italian Three Pipers

 

Destroyers of the Regia Marina
World War I naval ships of Italy
World War II torpedo boats of Italy
 
Destroyer classes